Life in London – in full, Life in London; or, The Day and Night Scenes of Jerry Hawthorn, Esq., and his elegant friend, Corinthian Tom, accompanied by Bob Logic, the Oxonian, in their Rambles and Sprees through the Metropolis – is a book by the author and journalist Pierce Egan, first published in 1821. It depicts the progress through London of two young men and their associates, encountering both high- and low-life. The book has coloured illustrations by George and Robert Cruikshank, which were much admired at the time and subsequently.

The book was first published in monthly instalments, and was an instant success. Several adaptations for the stage followed almost immediately, the most successful of which was Tom and Jerry, or Life in London which ran for a record-breaking 100 performances.

Background

Pierce Egan (1772-1849) was a British journalist in the late-18th and early-19th centuries. His two volumes of "Boxiana" – "Sketches of ancient and modern pugilism" – published in 1812 and 1818, established his reputation. According to the Oxford Dictionary of National Biography he virtually created modern  sporting journalism – with all its strengths and weaknesses.

Given the great popularity of his accounts of country sports and pastimes, Egan conceived the idea of a similar description of the amusements pursued by  sporting men in London. In 1821 he announced the publication of Life in London, in monthly shilling instalments, and recruited the Cruikshank brothers, George (1792-1878) and Robert (1789-1856) to draw and engrave the illustrations, which would be coloured by hand in each copy. King George IV, who knew and liked Egan, accepted the dedication of the forthcoming work, despite having been the target of satirical drawings by George Cruikshank.

Publication
The first number of Life in London; or, The Day and Night Scenes of Jerry Hawthorn, Esq., and his elegant friend, Corinthian Tom, accompanied by Bob Logic, the Oxonian, in their Rambles and Sprees through the Metropolis was published in January 1821, "elegantly printed in Royal Octavo". According to Egan's biographer, J. W. Ebsworth, writing in 1888:

The work was published in book form "illustrated with 50 exquisite Engravings" in November 1821, at £1 16s (equivalent to about £150 in 2020 terms).

Adaptations, plagiarism and riposte
The lack of copyright protection at the time meant that the success of the book was seized on by imitators. It was pirated and plagiarised, as in this sixpenny rival publication:

There were numerous stage adaptations – one by Egan himself – one of which (not Egan's) called Tom and Jerry, staged at the Adelphi Theatre, achieved the distinction of being the first play with a consecutive run of 100 performances in London.

Egan returned to the theme in 1828, publishing a riposte to the pirates and plagiarists in the form of his Finish to the Adventures of Tom, Jerry, and Logic, with coloured illustrations by Robert Cruikshank.

Later history
The work did not last well. W. M. Thackeray, who had been enthusiastic about the book as a young man, wrote in 1840:

When Thackeray located a copy twenty years later he found it "not so brilliant as I had supposed it to be". He thought the pictures "just as fine as ever" but the writing vulgar and the content "more curious than amusing".

In an article on "The History of Tom and Jerry" in 1870, the theatrical newspaper The Era observed that the Cruikshank illustrations displayed a considerable amount of life and spirit, but the text was "without real humour and striking incident, a mere mass of slang and verbiage".

Linguistic legacy
After the publication of Egan's book and the various theatrical adaptations, the term "Tom and Jerry" entered the English language. The Oxford English Dictionary cites examples of its use – to describe young men given to drinking, gambling, and riotous living – in the US, Australia and Britain throughout the 19th and 20th centuries and into the 21st. In British usage a "Tom and Jerry shop" was a 19th-century term for a small tavern or alehouse – "especially one regarded as disreputable". In American usage the phrase "Tom and Jerry" came to be applied from at latest the 1840s to an alcoholic drink resembling egg nog. The use of the names for the popular cartoon cat and mouse is evidently unconnected with Egan's heroes: the names of the feline and rodent protagonists were chosen from suggestions by hundreds of MGM employees in a competition before the series was launched in 1940.

Notes, references and sources

Notes

References

Sources

External links
 Pierce Egan (1821) [1869], Life in London; or, The day and night scenes of Jerry Hawthorn, esq., and his elegant friend Corinthian Tom in their rambles and sprees through the metropolis. With numerous coloured illus. from real life designed by I.R. & G. Cruikshank, Chatto & Windus. via Internet Archive

1821 British novels
19th century in London
19th-century novels